Volodymyr Petrovych Pak (17 June 1934 – 6 January 2022) was a Ukrainian politician. A member of the People's Union "Our Ukraine, he served in the Verkhovna Rada from 2005 to 2006. He died on 6 January 2022, at the age of 87.

Education 
He graduated from school in the village. Velyki Didushychi, Stryj district, Lviv region.

From 1958 to 1960 he studied at the Lviv Cooperative Technical School, majoring in food and industrial goods.

In 1966-1971 he studied at the Lviv Institute of Trade and Economics, majoring in trade economics.

Parliamentary activity 
The person of the candidate for the post of President of Ukraine Viktor Yushchenko was entrusted in TVO No. 92 (2004–2005).

He was a People's Deputy of the 4th convocation from March 16, 2005 to May 25, 2006 from the Yushchenko Bloc "Our Ukraine", № 75 on the list. At the time of the election: Chairman of the Board of the Kyiv Regional Consumers' Union, non-partisan. Member of the Our Ukraine faction (since March 2005). Member of the Committee on Construction, Transport, Housing and Communal Services (since October 2005).

March 2006, Candidate for People's Deputies of Ukraine from the Our Ukraine Bloc, № 150 on the list. At the time of the election: People's Deputy of Ukraine, member of the People's Union “Our Ukraine” party.

He was involved in the liquidation of the Chernobyl disaster.

References

1934 births
2022 deaths
People from Lviv Oblast
Our Ukraine (political party) politicians
Fourth convocation members of the Verkhovna Rada
Recipients of the Order of Prince Yaroslav the Wise, 5th class